K–12, from kindergarten to 12th grade, is an English expression that indicates the range of years of publicly supported primary and secondary education found in the United States and Canada, which is similar to publicly supported school grades before tertiary education in several other countries, such as Afghanistan, Australia, Canada, China, Ecuador, Egypt, India, Iran, the Philippines, South Korea, and Turkey.

History
U.S. public education was conceived of in the late 18th century. In 1790, Pennsylvania became the first state to require some form of free education for everyone regardless of whether they could afford it. New York passed similar legislation in 1805. In 1820, Massachusetts became the first state to create a tuition-free high school, Boston English.

The first K–12 public school systems appeared in the early 19th century. In the 1830s and 1840s, Ohioans were taking a significant interest in the idea of public education.  At that point in time, schools were commonly operated independently of each other, with little attempt at uniformity. The Akron School Law of 1847 changed this.  The city of Akron unified the operations, curriculum and funding of local schools into a single public school district: 

In 1849, the state of Ohio enacted a law modeled after the Akron law which extended the idea of school districts to cover the rest of the state.

By 1930, all 48 states had passed laws making education compulsory, and in 1965, President Lyndon B. Johnson signed the Elementary and Secondary Education Act (ESEA), which committed the federal government to significant ongoing expenditures to each state for the purpose of sustaining local K–12 school systems. The ESEA essentially made K–12 education the law of the land.

Since its inception, public K–12 has been debated and subject to several waves of reform throughout the 20th and 21st centuries. In the 1980s, Reagan's 'A Nation at Risk' initiative included provisions requiring public education to be evaluated based on standards, and teacher pay to be based on evaluations. In the 1990s, the Goals 2000 Act and the “Improving America’s Schools” act provided additional federal funding to states to bolster local K–12 systems. This was followed in the 2000s by a rigorous uptick in standards-based evaluations with the No Child Left Behind Act, and the Race to the Top Act. In 2015, President Barack Obama signed the Every Student Succeeds Act (ESSA), which returned some power to state governments with respect to evaluations and standards.

Etymology

The expression "K–12" is a shortening of kindergarten (K) for 5–6 year olds through twelfth grade (12) for 17–18 year-olds, as the first and last grades, 
respectively, of free education in these countries. The related term "P–12" is also occasionally used in Australia and the United States to refer to the sum of K–12 plus preschool education.

The image at the right illustrates the education system in the United States. The table shows the progression of the education system starting with the basic K–12 system then progressing through post-secondary education. K–14 refers to K–12 plus two years of post-secondary where training was received from vocational-technical institutions or community or junior colleges. K-16 is 12 years of compulsory education plus a 4-year undergrad program. The K numbers refer to the years of educational attainment and continues to progress upward accordingly depending on the degree being sought.

Usage 

The term is often used as a kind of shorthand to collectively refer to the entirety of primary and secondary education, as it is much easier than having to say one is referring in the aggregate to elementary, middle, and high school education.  However, it is rare for a school district to actually teach all K–12 grades at one unified school campus.  Even the smallest school districts try to maintain, at a minimum, a two-tier distinction between an elementary school (K–8) and a high school (9–12). Unified K-12 schools are common, however, in rural and remote areas throughout Canada. 

The term is often used in school website URLs, generally appearing before the country code top-level domain (or in the United States, the state top-level domain). The terms "PK–12", "PreK–12", or "Pre-K–12" are sometimes used to add pre-kindergarten.

It is also used by American multinationals selling into the educational sector, such as Dell where UK customers are presented with this as a market segment choice.

P–12 
In Australia, P–12 is sometimes used in place of K–12, particularly in Queensland, where it is used as an official term in the curriculum framework. P–12 schools serve children for the thirteen years from prep until Year 12, without including the separate kindergarten component. In Canada (Nova Scotia) P–12 is used commonly in place of K–12 and serves students from grade Primary through 12.

K–14, K–16, K–18 and K–20 

K–14 education also includes community colleges (the first two years of university). K–16 education adds a four-year undergraduate university degree. For simplicity purposes education shorthand was created to denote specific education levels of achievement. This shorthand is commonly used in articles, publications and educational legislation. The following list contains the most commonly found shorthand descriptors:

 P–14: Pre-school to associate degree
 P–16: Pre-school to bachelor's degree
 P–18: Pre-school to master's degree
 P–20: Pre-school to graduate degree
 K–14: Kindergarten to associate degree
 K–16: Kindergarten to bachelor's degree
 K–18: Kindergarten to master's degree
 K–20: Kindergarten to graduate degree

The Career Technical Education (CTE) Unit of the California Community College Economic Development and Workforce Preparation Division focuses on program coordination and advocacy, policy development and coordination with K–18 workforce preparation and career and technical education systems.

The ASCCC Chancellor's Office Career Technical Education (CTE) Unit of the Economic Development and Workforce Preparation Division focuses on program coordination and advocacy, policy development and coordination with K–18 workforce preparation and career and technical education systems. Responsible for the implementation of the Vocational and Technical Education Act (VTEA), managing and coordinating activities that impact other interagency and intra-agency objectives. In addition, the CTE Unit is also responsible for the development, dissemination, and implementation of the California State Plan and the annual performance reports.

Further reference to K–18 education can be found in this publication by Ann Diver-Stamnes and Linda Catelli in chapter 4 "College/University Partnership Projects for Instituting Change and Improvement in K–18 Education".

See also 

 Day care
 All-through school

Notes

References

Further reading 
 

Educational years
Educational stages
Education in the United States